Korugi Managed Reserve also known as  Korughi Managed Reserve  is a protected area in the Sagarejo Municipality in the Kakheti region of Georgia on the Iori Plateau near the border with Azerbaijan.

The reserve is part of Georgia's Protected Areas which also includes Mariamjvari Strict Nature Reserve and Iori Managed Reserve.

Korugi Managed Reserve includes parts of the  Iori river valley. It borders the Iori Managed Reserve which covers the area downstream of the Iori river.

Korugi Managed Reserve was established to protect the floodplain forest of the Iori river.

History and cultural attractions 
Korughi nature reserve  is mentioned in the Law Book (1709) of King Vakhtang VI of Kartli as "the place for hunting", and cutting trees and visiting the place was prohibited.  As with other mountainous regions the place was granted the status of "Holy Forest" and protected from disturbance by appointed guardsmen.

Archeological sites with Eneolithic-Early Bronze Age ruins, crypts of Middle Bronze Age and remains dating to the Late Bronze Age and Early Iron Age have been located near Korugi Managed Reserve. The Iori Plateau has several early monasteries, including David Gareja monastery complex.

See also
Iori (river)

References 

Managed reserves of Georgia (country)
Protected areas established in 1996
Geography of Kakheti
Tourist attractions in Kakheti
Floodplains of Europe